Karl Christian Ulmann (Riga – , Walk) was a Baltic German theologian.

From 1810 to 1814, he studied theology at the University of Dorpat (now University of Tartu), then continued his education at the universities of Jena and Göttingen. From 1817 to 1834, he served as pastor at St. Peters Capelle-Kremon. From 1835 to 1842, he was a professor of theology at Dorpat, where in 1839-1841 he was university rector. In 1844 he returned to Riga as an officer of the Livland Oberlandschulbehörde.

In 1856 he was named vice-president of the Evangelical Lutheran General Consistorium
in St. Petersburg, later being appointed Bischofswurde (March 1858).

Selected writings 
 Sammlung geistlicher Lieder für Gemeindegenossen der evangelisch-lutherischen Kirchen, 1843 - Collection of spiritual songs for the evangelical Lutheran church.
 Das gegewartige Verhältnis der evangelischen Brudergemeinde zur evangelisch-lutherischen Kirche in Liv- und Ehstland, 1862  - Current ratio involving the evangelical brotherhood to the evangelical Lutheran church in Livland and Estonia.
 'Lettisches wörterbuch, 1872 Latvian dictionary.
 Deutsch-lettisches Wörterbuch, 1880 - German-Latvian dictionary.

References 

1793 births
1871 deaths
Clergy from Riga
19th-century German Protestant theologians
German Lutheran theologians
19th-century German Lutheran clergy
Academic staff of the University of Tartu
Baltic-German people
19th-century German male writers
German male non-fiction writers